Some Type of Love is the third extended play (EP) by American singer Charlie Puth. It was released on May 1, 2015, by Atlantic Records and Artist Partner Group. The EP produced a single, "Marvin Gaye", which featured Meghan Trainor, and was released on February 10, 2015. All tracks except for "I Won't Tell a Soul" were later included in his full-length album Nine Track Mind.

Track listing

Charts

References 

2015 EPs
Charlie Puth albums
Soul EPs